Landfills are the primary method of waste disposal in many parts of the world, including United States and Canada. Bioreactor landfills are expected to reduce the amount of and costs associated with management of leachate, to increase the rate of production of methane (natural gas) for commercial purposes and reduce the amount of land required for land-fills. Bioreactor landfills are monitored and manipulate oxygen and moisture levels to increase the rate of decomposition by microbial activity.

Traditional landfills and associated problems 

Landfills are the oldest known method of waste disposal. Waste is buried in large dug out pits (unless naturally occurring locations are available) and covered. Bacteria and archaea decompose the waste over several decades producing several by-products of importance, including methane gas (natural gas), leachate, and volatile organic compounds (such as hydrogen sulfide (H2S), N2O2, etc.).

Methane gas, a strong greenhouse gas, can build up inside the landfill leading to an explosion unless released from the cell. Leachate are fluid metabolic products from decomposition and contain various types of toxins and dissolved metallic ions. If leachate escapes into the ground water it can cause health problems in both animals and plants. The volatile organic compounds (VOCs) are associated with causing smog and acid rain. With the increasing amount of waste produced, appropriate places to safely store it have become difficult to find.

Working of a bioreactor landfill 

There are three types of bioreactor:  aerobic, anaerobic and a hybrid (using both aerobic and anaerobic method). All three mechanisms involve the reintroduction of collected leachate supplemented with water to maintain moisture levels in the landfill. The micro-organisms responsible for decomposition are thus stimulated to decompose at an increased rate with an attempt to minimise harmful emissions.

In aerobic bioreactors air is pumped into the landfill using either vertical or horizontal system of pipes. The aerobic environment decomposition is accelerated and amount of VOCs, toxicity of leachate and methane are minimised. In anaerobic bioreactors with leachate being circulated the landfill produces methane at a rate much faster and earlier than traditional landfills. The high concentration and quantity of methane allows it to be used more efficiently for commercial purposes while reducing the time that the landfill needs to be monitored for methane production. Hybrid bioreactors subject the upper portions of the landfill through aerobic-anaerobic  cycles to increase decomposition rate while methane is produced by the lower portions of the landfill. Bioreactor landfills produce lower quantities of VOCs than traditional landfills, except H2S. Bioreactor landfills produce higher quantities of H2S. The exact biochemical pathway responsible for this increase is not well studied

Advantages of bioreactor landfills 

Bioreactor landfills accelerate the process of decomposition. As decomposition progresses, the mass of biodegradable components in the landfill declines, creating more space for dumping garbage. Bioreactor landfills are expected to increase this rate of decomposition and save up to 30% of space needed for landfills. With increasing amounts of solid waste produced every year and scarcity of landfill spaces, bioreactor landfill can thus provide a significant way of maximising landfill space. This is not just cost effective, but since less land is needed for the landfills, this is also better for the environment.

Furthermore, most landfills are monitored for at least 3 to 4 decades to ensure that no leachate or landfill gases escape into the community surrounding the landfill site. In contrast, bioreactor landfill are expected to decompose to level that does not require monitoring in less than a decade.  Hence, the landfill land can be used for other purposes such as reforestation or parks, depending on the location at an earlier date. In addition, re-using leachate to moisturise the landfill filters it. Thus, less time and energy is required to process the leachate, making the process more efficient.

Disadvantages of bioreactor landfills 

Bioreactor landfills are a relatively new technology. For the newly developed bioreactor landfills initial monitoring costs are higher to ensure that everything important is discovered and properly controlled. This includes gases, odours and seepage of leachate into the ground surface.

The increased moisture content of bioreactor landfill may reduce the structural stability of the landfill by increasing the pore water pressure within the waste mass.

Since the target of bioreactor landfills is to maintain a high moisture content, gas collection systems can be affected by the increased moisture content of the waste.

Implementation of bioreactor landfills 

Bioreactor landfills being a novel technology are still in the development phase and are being studied in the laboratory-scale. Pilot projects for bioreactor landfills are showing promise and more are being experimented with in different parts of the world. Despite the potential benefits of bioreactor landfills there are no standardised and approved designs with guidelines and operational procedures. Following is a list of bioreactor landfill projects which are being used to collect data for forming these needed guidelines and procedures:

United States 

	California
	Yolo County
	Florida
	Alachua County Southeast Landfill
	Highlands County
	New River Regional Landfill, Raiford
	Polk County Landfill, Winter Haven
	Kentucky
	Outer Loop Landfill
	Michigan
	Saint Clair County
	Mississippi
	Plantation Oaks Bioreactor Demonstration Project, Sibley
	Missouri
	Columbia
	New Jersey
	ACUA's Haneman Environmental Park, Egg Harbor Township
	North Carolina
	Buncombe County Landfill Project
	Virginia
	Maplewood Landfill and King George County Landfills
	Virginia Landfill Project XL Demonstration Project

Canada 

	Sainte-Sophie Bioreactor demonstration Project, Quebec

Australia 
 New South Wales
 WoodLawn, Goulburn
 Queensland
 Ti Tree Bioenergy, Ipswich

See also 

 Daily cover
 Landfill liner
 Landfill mining

References

External links
 Toward a Twenty-first Century Landfill - Yolo County's Bioreactor Research Project web page.
 Bioreactorlandfill.org

Landfill
Biochemical engineering
Bioreactors